Helichrysum italicum is a species of flowering plant in the family Asteraceae. It is sometimes called the curry plant because of the strong smell of its leaves. Other common names include Italian strawflower and immortelle. It grows on dry, rocky or sandy ground around the Mediterranean. The stems are woody at the base and can reach  or more in height. The clusters of yellow flowers are produced in summer, they retain their colour after picking and are used in dried flower arrangements.

It is used as a fixative in perfumes and has an intense fragrance.

This plant is sometimes used as a spice. Although called "curry plant" and smelling like curry powder, it is not related with this mixture of spices, nor with the curry tree (Murraya koenigii), and is not used as masala for curry dishes either. Rather, it has a resinous, somewhat bitter aroma reminiscent of sage or wormwood and its young shoots and leaves are often used stewed in Mediterranean meat, fish or vegetable dishes until they have imparted their flavour, and removed before serving.

Cultivation
Helichrysum italicum is a tender perennial (USDA Zones 7–10). It is propagated by rooting semi-hardwood cuttings in summer and overwintering in frost-free conditions.

References

Sources

 David Burnie (1995) Wild Flowers of the Mediterranean. 
 T. G. Tutin et al. (1968) Flora Europaea, Volume 2. 
 J. Mastelić, O. Politeo and I. Jerković Contribution to the Analysis of the Essential Oil of Helichrysum italicum (Roth) G. Don. – Determination of Ester Bonded Acids and Phenols Molecules 2008, 13(4), 795-803

External links
Plants for a Future database

italicum
Medicinal plants of Europe
Plants described in 1830